Robert H. May (June 8, 1927 – July 20, 2014) was a Canadian ice hockey player and coach most well known for his brief tenure at North Dakota where he won the program's first National Champion in 1959.

Career
May played for North Dakota for two seasons in the early 1950s and was named captain his final year. After graduating May turned to coaching, first leading Wayzata High School then Roosevelt High School before he was named as the bench boss for his alma mater. May was appointed coach of the Fighting Sioux when the university's president chose him instead of Ken Johannson, when the athletic directors were undecided.

May's first season brought incredible success as the Fighting Sioux won their first conference title and reached the 1958 NCAA Championship game. The next year the WIHL was dissolved but that didn't stop May's team as they were again invited to the tournament only this time they were able to take home the Trophy, the programs first.

May left the program to become the coach of the Minneapolis Millers for a year before he entered dental school. He became the team dentist for the Minnesota North Stars in 1968 and served in that capacity until 1983. In 1974 he became the coach of the newly formed Wayzata Checkers girls ice hockey team and led the team for its first seven seasons. In that time his team won a state title, three national titles and took first place in the 1979 Friendship Tournament held in Helsinki. Later in life he was brought back to Wayzata High School the second time to coach the first two seasons of the girls ice hockey team. He was able to help the squad to a conference championship in his second year.

Dr. Bob May served in the Army, reaching the rank of colonel. Over the course of his life May wrote four books, including; "The Hockey Drill Book," "The Hockey Road: From High School, to College, to Pro," and "Girls Hockey in Minnesota; Where To Go From Here?". May was twice inducted into the North Dakota Athletic Hall of Fame, in 1981 as an individual and in 2002 as part of the championship team. He was also a charter member of the MGHCA Hall of Fame in 2013.

Personal life
Bob May died in 2014 at the age of 87 from pulmonary fibrosis. He was survived by his wife Beverley and their daughters Jan and Cathy.

Head coaching record

College

References

1927 births
2014 deaths
Canadian ice hockey coaches
Ice hockey people from Manitoba
High school ice hockey coaches in the United States
North Dakota Fighting Hawks men's ice hockey players
North Dakota Fighting Hawks men's ice hockey coaches
Canadian ice hockey defencemen